Seán Ryan (born 28 November 1986) is an Irish hurler and former Gaelic footballer who currently plays as a midfielder for the Offaly senior team.

Honours

Birr
Leinster Senior Club Hurling Championship (1): 2007
Offaly Senior Hurling Championship (4): 2005, 2006, 2007, 2008

References

1986 births
Living people
Birr hurlers
Offaly inter-county Gaelic footballers
Offaly inter-county hurlers